The women's 1000 metres in short track speed skating at the 2006 Winter Olympics began on 22 February, with the final on 25 February, at the Torino Palavela.

Records
Prior to this competition, the existing world and Olympic records were as follows:

No new world and Olympic records were set during this competition.

Results

Heats
The first round was held on 12 February. There were eight heats of three or four skaters each, with the top two finishers moving on to the quarterfinals. One skater, Yvonne Kunze, was advanced after being interfered with.

Heat 1

Quarterfinals

The top two finishers in each of the four quarterfinals advanced to the semifinals. Two skaters, Yang Yang (A) and Tania Vicent, were advanced after other racers were disqualified. One of the disqualified skaters was the 2005 world champion in the 1000 metres, Evgenia Radanova.

Quarterfinal 1

Quarterfinal 2

Quarterfinal 3

Quarterfinal 4

Semifinals
The top two finishers in each of the two semifinals qualified for the A final, while the third and fourth place skaters advanced to the B Final. Since two skaters were advanced from the quarters, each semifinal featured five skaters.

Semifinal 1

Semifinal 2

Finals
Choi Eun-kyung was disqualified in the A final, moving Yang Yang (A) up to bronze medal position and the winner of the B final, Tania Vicent, up to 4th.

Final A

Final B

References

Women's short track speed skating at the 2006 Winter Olympics